Janum Khan, better known by his stage name Jaykae, is a British rapper and actor from Small Heath, Birmingham.

Music career
Jaykae's start with music began when he started listening to other grime artists from London.

In 2017 he released a single, "Every Country," featuring Murkage Dave of the Murkage cartel. The song, produced by Skepta, was Radio 1's Tune of the Week. He has featured on Charlie Sloth's BBC show, Fire In The Booth, where he performed a two piece set which reflected on life and the recent passing of fellow grime artist and friend, Depzman. He has performed on the BBC radio show segment, The BBC Live Lounge, where he performed two of his own songs, "Moscow" and "Toothache", and also a cover of Cameo's "Candy". Jaykae has been described as the "essential voice of the city" of Birmingham.

He featured on Skepta's All-Star Remix of the single '"That's not me". He collaborated with Mike Skinner (of The Streets) producing the tracks "CCTV" and "Boys Will Be Boys". Jaykae has performed at Glastonbury, MADE, Reading Festival, Creamfields and Wireless Festival. He supported Skepta on his Konnichiwa tour, supported Stormzy at one of his gigs, and will also be supporting The Streets on their upcoming Greatest Hits tour. Jaykae was brought out at Drake's 2019 Birmingham concert. Jaykae completed his first solo headline tour in December 2017, where he performed in Manchester, London and Birmingham.

Jaykae's "Toothache" featured on the TV series Power.

In 2021, he collaborated with Jorja Smith on "1000 Nights".

Acting career 
Khan plays Azaar, a cocaine dealer in Small Heath, in season two of the BBC Three comedy-drama, Man Like Mobeen. In 2018, he appeared as himself on season three of Chicken Shop Date.

In the Amazon Prime Video series, Jungle, Khan plays Willow, an associate of one of the show's main villains. An Evening Standard review of the show states that Khan "lends a disconcerting lightness to his gangster role."

Personal life
Khan was born and raised in Small Heath, Birmingham and has Afghan, Egyptian, Irish and Pakistani heritage. He is an avid supporter of his local football club Birmingham City. He had a difficult childhood and was bullied as a young child. He faced many problems growing up after his father left when he was 6 years old.

Discography

Studio albums

Extended plays

Compilations

Singles

As lead artist

As featured artist

Guest appearances

References

Year of birth missing (living people)
Living people
English male rappers
English male actors of South Asian descent
English people of Afghan descent
English people of Egyptian descent
English people of Pakistani descent
Grime music artists
People from Small Heath, Birmingham
Rappers from Birmingham, West Midlands
British rappers of Pakistani descent
English people of Irish descent